Clive Holland is an English television and radio presenter. From 2009 to 2013 he presented the BBC One daytime show Cowboy Trap. He has also presented other programmes such as GMTV and Channel 4’s ‘Big Big’ Holiday Show and on stage at the Ideal Home Show, the RHS Hampton Court Flower Show and London Fashion Week.

Biography
Holland became known for his voice-over and live theatre work. In his early years, Holland was well known as a DJ and broadcaster. His television work appears to be very varied since his first appearance on Lorraine Kelly's show, LK Today in July 2000. Roles documented include appearances in the English television drama series Dalziel and Pascoe, Merseybeat and Doctors. Holland has also featured in many commercials for MTV, J2O, and Yell.com and others, and also put his DIY skills to use on many shows on Sky Television in the first decade of the 21st century.

Holland also featured in a government campaign called; 'Love food hate waste'. His live work at the Ideal Home Show in London concentrates mainly on interior / exterior designs plus building advice hints and tips.

References

External links

Cowboy Trap

20th-century births
British radio presenters
British television presenters
Living people
Year of birth missing (living people)
Place of birth missing (living people)